Robodoc may refer to:

 Robot doctor (medical)
 ROBODoc (software), automated source code documentation tool
 RoboDoc (film), 2008 National Lampoon medical comedy
 Robo Doc (robot), a combat robot featured on the television show Robot Wars, see List of Robot Wars robots

See also

 Robo (disambiguation)
 Doc (disambiguation)
 Doc Robot (DC Comics), a comic book character, see List of Metal Men members
 Robot
 Robotics
 Roboticist, such as doctor of robotics
 Cyberneticist, such as doctor of cybernetics
 Doctor Cyber, comic book character
 Cyber Doctor, online health website